Abdalla Abdelgadir El-Sheikh (born 12 September 1988), also known as Abdalla Abdel Gadir, is a Sudanese middle distance runner who specializes in the 1500 metres.

Career
He finished fifth (in 800 m) at the 2003 World Youth Championships and twelfth at the 2006 World Junior Championships. He won the gold medal in the 1500 m at the 2003 Afro-Asian Games. He competed at the 2008 Olympic Games without progressing to the second round.

Personal bests
His personal best times are:
800 metres - 1:48.74 min (2004)
1500 metres - 3:38.93 min (2008)
Mile run - 4:00.84 min (2003)

References

 
 Abdalla Abdel Gadir at ESPN 2008 Summer Olympics website

External links
 
 

1988 births
Living people
Sudanese male middle-distance runners
Athletes (track and field) at the 2008 Summer Olympics
Olympic athletes of Sudan
World Athletics Championships athletes for Sudan